The Governor is a 2016 political Drama sin Calabar and Cross River, The film was directed by Ema Edosio and written by Yinka Ogun, Tunde Babalola and Debo Oluwatuminu. Mo Abudu is the producer of the 13 episodes TV series.

Premier 
The political drama was premiered 7 July 2016 on the DStv by 9pm.

Cast 
Caroline Chikezie as Angelo Ochello
Samuel Abiola as Toju Ochello
Jude Chukwuka as Chief Sobifa Thomson
Kunle Coker as Senator Briggs
Taiwo Obileye as Chief Momo-Ali
Bimbo Manuel as David Ochello
Kachi Nnochiri as Ahmed Halo
Lord Frank as Henry
Kelechi Udegbe as Paul
Ani iyoho as Musa
Edmond Enaibe as Friday Bello

Synopsis 
Angelo Ochello - deputy Governor of the fictional Savannah state - finds herself in a cornered situation following the governor's sudden death. She was able to rule the office with the help of her chief of staff while her matrimonial home does not suffer.

Reception 
According to fans, the film is one of such that one learn more about politics. According to Kunle Coker, one of the actors in the political film. The Governor is a must-watch for everyone planning to venture into politics.

See also 
 Mo Abudu
 Ebonylife TV
 Chief daddy 2

References 

Nigerian drama films
2016 films